¡Hello Friends! (subtitled Jack Dangers plays with the records of Tino Corp.) is a compilation album DJ'ed by Jack Dangers including music produced by himself and Ben Stokes.

Track listing
Loop Finder General: "Shave My Head" – 4:00
Tino: "Tropical Soul/Tino's Beat" – 3:38
Tino: "Christmas In Hawaii" – 2:48
Tino: "Exercise For The Left Hand" – 2:43
Tino: "Mambothon" – 7:02
Tino: "Kick It Dub" – 4:09
Bo Square: "Numbers" – 5:45
Produced by: Mike Powell
Tino: "D.U.B. Dub" – 3:05
Tino: "Toasted Dub" – 4:15
Tino: "Elegant Dub" – 3:40
Produced by: Mike Powell
Tino: "Ritmos Latinos" – 3:48
Meat Beat Manifesto: "Structures" – 4:17
Tino: "La Tino Beat" – 2:56
DHS: "House Of God (Jack Dangers Mix)" – 2:42
Remix by: Jack Dangers
DHS: House Of God (DHS Mix)" – 6:57
A music video is also included on the CD in .mov format:
Ben Stokes: "Tino's Factory Video" – 3:34

References

Jack Dangers albums
2001 compilation albums
Shadow Records compilation albums
DJ mix albums